Events from the year 1632 in Ireland.

Incumbent
Monarch: Charles I

Events
September 8 – Government order for the destruction of St Patrick's Purgatory in Lough Derg, County Donegal, carried out on 25 October.
Compilation of the Annals of the Four Masters begins at Donegal.
Peter Lombard's De Regno Hiberniae sanctorum insula commentarius is published at Louvain.

Births

Deaths
November 30 – Émonn Ó Braonain, subject of a verse lament.
Domhnall Spainneach Mac Murrough Caomhanach; the last king of Leinster.
John Rider, Latin lexicographer and Anglican Bishop of Killaloe from 1612 to 1632 (b. 1562)
Richard Tyrrell
Approximate date – Somhairle Mac Domhnail, soldier.

References

 
1630s in Ireland
Ireland